Helenium scorzonerifolium is a Mesoamerican perennial plant in the sunflower family. It is native to Mexico and Central America, from Jalisco and Durango south as far as Guatemala.

References

External links
Photo of herbarium specimen collected in southern Mexico in 1860s

Plants described in 1836
scorzonerifolium
Flora of Mexico
Flora of Guatemala